2016 Atomized (also known as the Anti-Album) is the eighth studio album by Danish indie rock duo The Raveonettes, released on 17 February 2017 for digital download and set to be released on 21 April 2017 on CD. A special Record Store Day vinyl version will be released the following day. All songs were previously released individually for download in 2016 through Spotify, Apple Music, YouTube and Pledgemusic.

Background
In late 2015, the band announced plans for the Rave-Sound-of-the-Month and that they would be recording and releasing twelve new songs online for each month of the year in 2016. The collection of songs was dubbed the "Anti-Album". "Every month throughout 2016 we'll be dropping a freshly recorded track. Taking you on a ride, potentially schizophrenic & disjointed, potentially cohesive and related" the band said.

Critical reception

Track listing

References

2017 albums
The Raveonettes albums